, is an arcade game originally released by Sunsoft in 1985. The game was released for the Famicom (Nintendo Entertainment System) on November 28 of the same year, and is a multi-directional scrolling action game which contains some elements of a top-down shooter. The game is known outside Japan as Boomerang and Farmers Rebellion. Its main character, Gonbe, makes a cameo appearance in Atlantis no Nazo, another Sunsoft game.

The game was re-released as part of multiple compilations. A mobile phone version was published on September 19, 2003. A renewed version titled  was released over the SoftBank Mobile and EZweb networks in July 2006. A revival of the game titled Ikki Unite is scheduled to release in 2022.

Gameplay
The game is set in medieval Japan, where a poor farming village is planning an insurrection to overthrow their feudal overlord. However, the only participants in the revolt are the player's character, and the optional second-player character, and the player battles against an army of ninjas instead of samurai and foot soldiers. The game displays text in the vertical direction, which was very unusual for a game of the period, and all in-game messages use speech reminiscent of jidaigeki films.

The character's movement is controlled with an 8-way joystick, and pressing the single button allows the player to attack by throwing a sickle. The direction in which the sickle is thrown cannot be determined by the player, and the weapon will automatically head towards the closest enemy. This forces an emphasis on avoiding attacks rather than attacking aggressively. The right side of the screen displays the player's points, along with a map of the level. The location of koban coins is displayed on this map, but players must circumvent walls and other barriers to go to those locations. This map is not included in the Famicom version of the game.

Enemy characters include a black or red ninja, bomber ninja, and wild boar (some of these enemies do not appear in the Famicom version). Red ninjas move faster than all of the other characters and are harder to hit, but yield twice as many points. The player loses a life when they come in contact with any of the enemy characters or projectiles. The game ends when the player loses with no lives remaining. A ghost (or yōkai) will also appear on occasion, and the player will be unable to throw their sickle if they come in contact with it. The ghost's effect will dissipate if the player touches the jizō or komainu statues which are present on some levels. A grotesque handmaiden may also appear on some levels, and coming in contact with this handmaiden will prevent the player from moving for a short period of time. Though the player can still attack with the sickle in this condition, it becomes impossible to dodge enemy projectiles, making it very difficult to progress. The handmaiden character does not appear in the i-appli mobile phone version.

A level is completed when the player picks up all eight gold koban coins which are spread throughout the map, or if they capture the daikan (Japanese feudal lord) that can randomly appear during the level. There are eight levels included in the original game, and the Famicom version contains four levels, with four more secret levels where the location of the coins is changed. The player returns to the first level after all eight levels are completed. Completing the cycle twice ends the game in the i-appli version, but the player can continue the game indefinitely in the Famicom version by choosing to ignore the coins and concentrate on fending off the enemies.

The opening animation was not included and the number of levels was decreased to half the original number in the Famicom version. However, several new items were made available. The bamboo spear allows the player to attack by thrusting the spear forwards, but players cannot throw the sickle or attack in other directions during this time. This becomes a disadvantage against enemies that use projectiles, so it is advantageous to ignore the item on some levels. Eating a daikon (Japanese radish) increase the player's speed, and obtaining an emakimono (Japanese scroll) gives the player an additional life. The leaf item allows the player to duplicate and become invincible, but their attack power remains the same. The smoke item allows the player to advance to the bonus level after completing the current level.

A senryōbako (Japanese treasure chest) appears in non-Famicom versions of the game, and the character's animated expression changes to laughter when it is obtained. However, the player cannot move while this animation lasts, making them very vulnerable to projectile attacks. Like the bamboo spear in the Famicom version, the treasure chest can actually hinder the player's progress. However, the bamboo spear awards the player bonus points when obtained, and the number of points gained by killing enemies increases while the player is in possession of the spear.

Players can advance to the bonus level if they obtain an onigiri. In the Famicom version, the bonus level is accessed by obtaining the smoke item from the jizō statues. The bonus level is played by catching onigiri thrown in random trajectories by a sennin. The player gains bonus points for every onigiri that they manage to catch, and an extra life is awarded if the player successfully catches all 10 onigiri. However, the character's slow movement makes it difficult to catch all 10 onigiri unless the players cooperate in the multiplayer mode.

In the mobile phone version, the narrower width of the game screen makes it easier for the player to catch all 10 onigiri, but the onigiri are thrown at a noticeably faster speed. This type of bonus game became a fixture for SunSoft products, and appears in other games like Dead Zone (1986) and Tenka no Goikenban: Mito Kōmon (1987).

The Famicom version consists of four different levels, with the fifth level being an alternate version of the first, the sixth being an alternate version of the second, and so on. The difficulty gradually increases as the game progresses, and the game levels loop infinitely. There is no ending screen for the game, and completion of level 99 brings the player to level 00, which is an alternate version of the fourth level. The player returns to level 01 after completing level 00. A "secret letter" appears on-screen after each of the first 8 levels in the Famicom version. The secret letters displayed are E, R, A, W, T, F, O, S, in order, and if the letters are read backwards as indicated in the game's instruction manual, they form the word "SOFTWARE." This code word was required for the gift campaign that was conducted during the game's initial release.

Reception
Japanese essayist Jun Miura coined the term  after playing the Famicom version of Ikki. Regardless, the game still sold reasonably well and was one of Sunsoft's most popular products at the time. Game Machine listed Ikki on their August 15, 1985 issue as being the tenth most-popular arcade game at the time.

Legacy

Re-releases
The game was re-released for Microsoft Windows as part of the Ultra2000 Sunsoft Classic games compilation, which was released on June 29, 2001. The game has also been coupled with Tōkaidō Gojūsan-tsugi and Yūyū Sunsoft kessaku-sen 2 (released July 2, 2004), and was coupled with Super Arabian for the PlayStation compilation Memorial Series Sunsoft Vol. 1. This compilation was also released for the PlayStation Network download service for the PlayStation 3.

In October 2022 it was announced that sales would be discontinued on November 28, 2022.

The arcade version of Ikki was re-released on the PlayStation Network for the PlayStation 4 on December 4, 2016, and also became available on Nintendo's Virtual Console on January 16, 2007, for the Wii, on February 13, 2013, for the Nintendo 3DS, on May 22, 2013, for the Wii U, and on May 24, 2018 for the Nintendo Switch.

Ikki Mobile
The mobile version of Ikki, titled  was released by SunSoft in July, 2006, for the SoftBank Mobile and EZweb mobile phone networks. Though the content is identical to that of the previous versions, Ikki Mobile contains a series of minigames and a moe drawing trading card series, which can be purchased using the coins collected in the main game. The mobile version consists of 7 different levels, and several changes were made to the characters and graphics. The handmaiden character was revived from the i-appli version, and the bamboo spear has the added effect of deflecting enemy projectiles. The ghost enemy is no longer invincible, and the ninja and handmaiden change to kunoichi and princesses, respectively, as the game progresses.

The four minigames become available after the player has completed the 7-level cycle at least once. The first is a slot machine game, where up to 3 coins can be bet at one time. The second is a concentration game that requires 10 coins to play. Up to 5 mistakes are allowed per game, and picking the lucky card gives the player 10 bonus coins. The third game is a frog derby game, where the player bets up to 10 coins on the winning frog. The last minigame is the onigiri catching game that was the bonus level in the Famicom version. It also requires 10 coins to play. Though the content is mostly the same, it is impossible to catch all 10 onigiri, as some are thrown off the borders of the game screen. Small and large gold coins are thrown in addition to the onigiri, and 5 onigiri count for 1 gold coin while 5 small gold coins count for 1 large gold coin.

The gold coins collected during the game can also be used to buy packages of the in-game trading card series (capturing a feudal lord in the mobile version yields a bonus of 10 gold coins). Three random cards are included in each card package, and a set of card consists of 16 different cards. Each set of cards creates a single illustration, and the main game's difficulty increases every 48 cards collected. Completing two sets allows the player to access a special webpage from the title screen, where mobile wallpaper can be downloaded after a short survey.

Ikki Unite 
A Sunsoft-developed revival of the game titled Ikki Unite is scheduled to release for Microsoft Windows in 2022.

Other media

Manga 
 In 1986, Ikki was adapted as a manga by Sawada Yukio and published by Wan Pakku Comics, released as a story in the anthology series 
 Ikki, is one of the video games was adapted by Manga titled , published in the Gamest Comics collection from April 1999, drawn by Kouta Hirano.

Novel
 The novel いっき ーLEGEND OF TAKEYARI MASTERー, featuring all-new characters, was released by Sunsoft and Hifumi Shobo in 2013. A promotional video was released for the book.

Other appearances 
Gonbe appeared in the Shanghai Musume: Mahjong Girls for the iOS and Android in 2011, including a Sunsoft Characters. It is also was made in Joker card in Moe Moe Daifūgō ~Zenkoku Bishōjo Meguri~ for the iOS and Android in 2012.

The setting and characters of Ikki are featured in Blaster Master Zero 2, an entry in Sunsoft's Blaster Master series developed and published by Inti Creates. Gonbei and Tae (based on their depictions from the 2013 novelization) are featured as Metal Attacker pilots on the planet Montoj, where they ally with protagonists Jason Frudnick and Eve to defeat the Mutant Overlord "Zavira" (from Atlantis no Nazo) that had taken over the planet.

References

External links
Ikki Online official website
Virtual Console version official website
Memorial Series: SunSoft Vol. 1 official website
Ikki at Arcade History
Ikki at Arcade Archives Page

1985 video games
Action video games
Arcade video games
Nintendo Entertainment System games
Nintendo Switch games
PlayStation 4 games
Mobile games
Sunsoft games
Tose (company) games
Video games developed in Japan
Video games set in feudal Japan
Virtual Console games
Virtual Console games for Wii U
Hamster Corporation games
Multiplayer and single-player video games